Vincenzo Fasano (2 September 1951 – 23 January 2022) was an Italian politician. A member of National Alliance and Forza Italia, he served in the Chamber of Deputies from 2001 to 2006 and again from 2018 to 2022. He died of cancer in Salerno on 23 January 2022, at the age of 70.

References

1951 births
2022 deaths
Members of the Chamber of Deputies (Italy)
Deputies of Legislature XVIII of Italy
Forza Italia politicians
Italian Social Movement politicians
National Alliance (Italy) politicians
The People of Freedom politicians
People from Salerno
Deaths from cancer in Campania